Candid photography is photography captured without creating a posed appearance. This style is also called street photography, spontaneous photography or snap shooting. Professional photographers sometimes shoot candid photos of strangers on the street or in other public places such as parks and beaches. Candid photography captures natural expressions and moments that might not be possible to reproduce in a studio or posed photo shoot. This style of photography is most often used to capture people in their natural state without them noticing the camera. The main focus is on capturing the candid expressions and moments of life. Candid photography can be used in a variety of settings such as family gatherings, special events, and everyday street scenes. It is also a popular choice for wedding photos and professional portraits. Candid photography is often seen as a more honest representation of the subject than posed photography. To capture candid photos, the photographer may need to observe the subject from a distance or use a long lens or telephoto zoom lens. This allows for capturing the subject in their natural environment without them being aware of the camera. The photographer may need to be quick and have an eye for interesting compositions and backgrounds.  

Candid photography can be used to capture a wide variety of subjects and occasions. It is a popular style of photography for street photography, wedding photography, portrait photography, and event photography. It can be used to capture candid moments of life, such as people walking on the street, children playing in the park, or family gatherings. It can also be used to capture moments of joy and celebration. Candid photography is also used in journalism and documentary photography.

A candid photograph is a photograph captured without creating a posed appearance. The candid nature of a photograph is unrelated to the subject's knowledge about or consent to the fact that photographs are being taken, and are unrelated to the subject's permission for further usage and distribution. The crucial factor is the actual absence of posing. However, if the subject is absolutely unaware of being photographed and does not even expect it, then such photography is secret photography, which is a special case of candid photography.

As an art form

The person who is generally credited with being the first available light "candid" photographer is Dr. Erich Salomon who photographed the social elite in Berlin, Germany and politicians and diplomats during the late 1920s and early 1930s with a 1 3/4 x 2 1/4 glass plate or cut, sheet, film camera called the Ermanox, fitted with an f/1.8 Ernostar lens. The Ermanox was introduced by the Ernemann-Werke (Works) of Dresden, Germany, in 1924.

It was said by the French Minister of the Colonies Aristide Briand, that "There are just three things necessary for a League of Nations conference: a few Foreign Secretaries, a table and Salomon". On seeing Salomon's photographs, so utterly different in revelation from the traditional, posed, studio portraits or the formal, flash-powder illuminated, group photographs, an English editor called them "candid photographs" an art of observation , a phrase which got stuck with the public.

The camera most suited to Salomon's approach, and which came to be dubbed as the "candid camera", was the Leica, the camera designed by Oscar Barnack and introduced by the Ernst Leitz company in 1924 and which was the forerunner of all 35 mm cameras of today.

Some professional photographers developed candid photography into an art form. Henri Cartier-Bresson might be considered the master of the art of candid photography, capturing the "decisive moment" in everyday life over a span of several decades. Arthur Fellig, better known as Weegee, was one of the great photographers to document life in the streets of New York to often capture life — and death — at their rawest edges.

Almost all the successful photographers in the field of candid photography master the art of making people relax and feel at ease around the camera, they master the art of blending in at parties, of finding acceptance despite an obvious intrusive element - the camera. How subjects react to photographer's presence with the camera depends on how knowledgeable the artist is on the craft, the approach and the execution of the shot.  This is certainly true for most celebrity photographers, such as René Burri, or Raeburn Flerlage.

It could be argued that candid photography is the purest form of photojournalism. There is a fine line between photojournalism and candid photography, a line that was blurred by photographers such as Bresson and Weegee. Photojournalism often sets out to tell a story in images, whereas candid photography simply captures people living an event.

Camera equipment

Unobtrusive camera equipment, often small in size, is preferred for candid photography to avoid disturbing subjects. Black-painted cameras have long been preferred.

Candid photography also typically requires use of available light since flash alerts subjects to the camera and may startle them, causing them to react or become self-conscious and stage their photo appearance rather than behaving naturally.  For this reason, early candid photography took place outdoors, where the sun provides ample light. Indoor candid photography required the development of more sensitive films with higher film speeds (ISO) and aggressive methods of developing films ("push processing") to increase sensitivity.  Therefore, candid photography was historically associated with the grainy, high contrast images that result from these techniques. The introduction of digital cameras has made it easier to take pictures in low light conditions without flash.  Full-frame DSLR cameras have brought high-ISO noise to historically low levels, allowing for clean, saturated images at speeds up to and beyond ISO 6400.

Although point and shoot cameras with affordable lenses have been used widely for candid photography, the resulting photographs can suffer from vignetting, distortion and over saturation of color. Due to short reaction times for the photographer, exposure or focus may be slightly off.  Since flash cannot be used, pictures are often taken at low shutter speeds and show blurring from movement of the subject, or camera shaking.  All these faults are usually considered acceptable because of the limitations of candid photography.

Candid film photographers have been forced to use black and white, rather than color film because of its greater film speed.  This has given candid photos a characteristic appearance.  Film provides roughly 3 stops more dynamic range compared to earlier digital cameras. However, improved, smaller digital cameras are providing photographers with increased dynamic range, greater lens speeds and sharpness, enabling them to capture high quality candid images.

See also
 Candid Camera
 Celebrity photography
 Documentary photography
 Paparazzi
 Photojournalism
 Reportage
 Secret photography
 Snapshot (photography)
 Street photography
 Upskirt photography

References

External links
 
 Photojournalism Ethics: Chapter 5, "The Right to Privacy"

Photography by genre
Photojournalism